This is a list of schools in Leicestershire, England.

State-funded schools

Primary schools 

 Ab Kettleby School, Ab Kettleby
 Albert Village Primary School, Albert Village
 All Saints CE Primary School, Coalville
 All Saints CE Primary School, Wigston
 Arnesby CE Primary School, Arnesby
 Asfordby Hill Primary School, Asfordby Hill
 Ashby Hastings Primary School, Ashby-de-la-Zouch
 Ashby Hill Top Primary School, Ashby-de-la-Zouch
 Ashby Willesley Primary School, Ashby-de-la-Zouch
 Ashby-de-la-Zouch CE Primary School, Ashby-de-la-Zouch
 Badgerbrook Primary School, Whetstone
 Barlestone CE Primary School, Barlestone
 Barrow Hall Orchard CE Primary School, Barrow upon Soar
 Barwell CE Academy, Barwell
 Barwell Infant School, Barwell
 Battling Brook Primary School, Hinckley
 Beacon Academy, Loughborough
 Belton CE Primary School, Belton
 Belvoirdale Community Primary School, Coalville
 Billesdon CE Primary School, Billesdon
 Bishop Ellis RC Primary Academy, Thurmaston
 Blaby Stokes CE Primary School, Blaby
 Blaby Thistly Meadow Primary School, Blaby
 Blackfordby St Margaret's CE Primary School, Blackfordby
 Booth Wood Primary School, Loughborough
 Bottesford CE Primary School, Bottesford
 Bringhurst Primary School, Bringhurst
 Brocks Hill Primary School, Oadby
 Brookside Primary School, Oadby
 Broom Leys School, Coalville
 Broomfield Community Primary School, East Goscote
 Brownlow Primary School, Melton Mowbray
 Buckminster Primary School, Buckminster
 Burbage CE Infant School, Burbage
 Burbage Junior School, Burbage
 Burton-on-the-Wolds Primary School, Burton on the Wolds
 Captains Close Primary School, Asfordby
 Christ Church & St Peter's CE Primary School, Mountsorrel
 Church Hill CE Junior School, Thurmaston
 Church Hill Infant School, Thurmaston
 Church Langton CE Primary School, Church Langton
 Claybrooke Primary School, Claybrooke Parva
 Cobden Primary School, Loughborough
 Congerstone Primary School, Congerstone
 Cosby Primary School, Cosby
 Cossington CE Primary School, Cossington
 Croft CE Primary School, Croft
 Croxton Kerrial CE Primary School, Croxton Kerrial
 Desford Community Primary School, Desford
 Diseworth CE Primary School, Diseworth
 Donisthorpe Primary School, Donisthorpe
 Dove Bank Primary School, Nailstone
 Dunton Bassett Primary School, Dunton Bassett
 Eastfield Primary School, Thurmaston
 Elizabeth Woodville Primary School, Groby
 Ellistown Community Primary School, Ellistown
 Enderby Danemill Primary School, Enderby
 Fairfield Community Primary School, South Wigston
 Farndon Fields Primary School, Market Harborough
 Fernvale Primary School, Thurnby
 Fleckney CE Primary School, Fleckney
 Fossebrook Primary School, Leicester Forest East
 Foxbridge Primary School, Castle Donington
 Foxton Primary School, Foxton
 Frisby CE Primary School, Frisby on the Wreake
 Gaddesby Primary School, Gaddesby
 Gilmorton Chandler CE Primary School, Gilmorton
 Glen Hills Primary School, Glen Parva
 Glenfield Primary School, Glenfield
 Glenmere Community Primary School, Wigston Magna
 Great Bowden CE Academy, Great Bowden
 Great Dalby School, Great Dalby
 Great Glen St Cuthbert's CE Primary School, Great Glen
 Greenfield Primary School, Countesthorpe
 Greystoke Primary School, Narborough
 Griffydam Primary School, Griffydam
 The Grove Primary School, Melton Mowbray
 The Hall Primary School, Glenfield
 Hallam Fields Primary School, Birstall
 Hallaton CE Primary School, Hallaton
 Hallbrook Primary School, Broughton Astley
 Harby CE Primary School, Harby
 Hathern CE Primary School, Hathern
 Heather Primary School, Heather
 Hemington Primary School, Hemington
 Higham-on-the-Hill CE Primary School, Higham on the Hill
 Highgate Primary School, Sileby
 Highcliffe Primary School, Birstall
 Hinckley Parks Primary School, Hinckley
 Holy Cross RC School, Whitwick
 Holywell Primary School, Loughborough
 Hose CE Primary School, Hose
 Houghton-on-the-Hill CE Primary School, Houghton on the Hill
 Hugglescote Community Primary School, Hugglescote
 Huncote Primary School, Huncote
 Husbands Bosworth CE Primary School, Husbands Bosworth
 Ibstock Junior School, Ibstock
 John Wycliffe Primary School, Lutterworth
 Kegworth Primary School, Kegworth
 Kibworth CE Primary School, Kibworth
 Kilby St Mary's CE Primary School, Kilby
 Kingsway Primary School, Braunstone Town
 Kirby Muxloe Primary School, Kirby Muxloe
 Lady Jane Grey Primary School, Groby
 Langmoor Primary School, Oadby
 The Latimer Primary School, Anstey
 Launde Primary School, Oadby
 Little Bowden School, Little Bowden
 Little Hill Primary School, Wigston
 Long Clawson CE Primary School, Long Clawson
 Long Whatton CE Primary School, Long Whatton
 Loughborough CE Primary School, Loughborough
 Lubenham All Saints CE Primary School, Lubenham
 Manorfield CE Primary School, Stoney Stanton
 Market Harborough CE Academy, Market Harborough
 Martinshaw Primary School, Groby
 The Meadow Community Primary School, Wigston Magna
 Meadowdale Primary School, Market Harborough
 Measham CE Primary School, Measham
 Mercenfeld Primary School, Markfield
 The Merton Primary School, Syston
 Millfield LEAD Academy, Braunstone Town
 Moira Primary School, Moira
 Mountfields Lodge School, Loughborough
 New Lubbesthorpe Primary School, Lubbesthorpe
 New Swannington Primary School, New Swannington
 Newbold CE Primary School, Newbold Coleorton
 Newbold Verdon Primary School, Newbold Verdon
 Newcroft Primary Academy, Shepshed
 Newlands Community Primary School, Earl Shilton
 Newton Burgoland Primary School, Newton Burgoland
 Newtown Linford Primary School, Newtown Linford
 Oakthorpe Primary School, Oakthorpe
 Old Dalby CE Primary School, Old Dalby
 Old Mill Primary School, Broughton Astley
 Orchard CE Primary School, Broughton Astley
 Orchard Community Primary School, Castle Donington
 Outwoods Edge Primary School, Loughborough
 Oxley Primary School, Shepshed
 Packington CE Primary School, Packington
 Parkland Primary School, South Wigston
 The Pastures Primary School, Narborough
 The Pochin School, Barkby
 Queniborough CE Primary School, Queniborough
 Ratby Primary School, Ratby
 Ravenhurst Primary School, Braunstone Town
 Red Hill Field Primary School, Narborough
 Redmile CE Primary School, Redmile
 Rendell School, Loughborough
 Richard Hill CE Primary School, Thurcaston
 Richmond Primary School, Hinckley
 Ridgeway Primary Academy, Market Harborough
 Riverside Community Primary School, Birstall
 Robert Bakewell Primary School, Loughborough
 Rothley CE Primary School, Rothley
 Sacred Heart RC Academy, Loughborough
 St Andrew's CE Primary School, North Kilworth
 St Bartholomew's CE Primary School, Quorn
 St Botolph's CE Primary School, Shepshed
 St Charles RC Primary Academy, Measham
 St Clare's RC Primary School, Coalville
 St Denys CE Infant School, Ibstock
 St Edward's CE Primary School, Castle Donington
 St Francis RC Primary School, Melton Mowbray
 St Hardulph's CE Primary School, Breedon on the Hill
 St John Fisher RC Academy, Wigston
 St Joseph's RC Academy, Market Harborough
 St Margaret's CE Primary School, Stoke Golding
 St Mary's CE Primary School, Bitteswell
 St Mary's CE Primary School, Hinckley
 St Mary's CE Primary School, Melton Mowbray
 St Mary's RC Primary School, Loughborough
 St Michael & All Angels CE Primary School, Rearsby
 St Peter and St Paul CE Academy, Syston
 St Peter's CE Primary Academy, Market Bosworth
 St Peter's CE Primary School, Whetstone
 St Peter's CE Primary School, Wymondham
 St Peter's RC Academy, Earl Shilton
 St Peter's RC Primary School, Hinckley
 St Simon and St Jude CE Primary School, Earl Shilton
 St Winefride's RC Academy, Shepshed
 Scalford CE Primary School
 Seagrave Village Primary School, Seagrave
 Sharnford CE Primary School, Sharnford
 Sheepy Magna CE Primary School, Sheepy Magna
 Sherard Primary School, Melton Mowbray
 Sherrier CE Primary School, Lutterworth
 Sileby Redlands Community Primary School, Sileby
 Sir John Moore CE Primary School, Appleby Magna
 Sketchley Hill Primary School, Burbage
 Snarestone CE Primary School, Snarestone
 Somerby Primary School, Somerby
 South Kilworth CE Primary School, South Kilworth
 Stafford Leys Community Primary School, Leicester Forest East
 Stanton under Bardon Community Primary School, Stanton under Bardon
 Stathern Primary School, Stathern
 Stonebow Primary School, Loughborough
 Swallowdale Primary School, Melton Mowbray
 Swannington CE Primary School, Swannington
 Swinford CE Primary School, Swinford
 Swithland St Leonard's CE Primary School, Swithland
 Thornton Primary School, Thornton
 Thorpe Acre Infant School, Loughborough
 Thorpe Acre Junior School, Loughborough
 Thringstone Primary School, Thringstone
 Thrussington CE Primary School, Thrussington
 Thurlaston CE Primary School, Thurlaston
 Thurnby St Luke's CE Primary School, Thurnby
 Thythorn Field Community Primary School, Wigston
 Townlands CE Primary School, Earl Shilton
 Tugby CE Primary School, Tugby
 Ullesthorpe CE Primary School, Ullesthorpe
 Viscount Beaumont's CE Primary School, Coleorton
 Waltham on the Wolds CE Primary School, Waltham on the Wolds
 Warren Hills Community Primary School, Coalville
 Water Leys Primary School, Wigston
 Westfield Infant School, Hinckley
 Westfield Junior School, Hinckley
 Whitwick St John The Baptist CE Primary School, Whitwick
 Witherley CE Primary School, Witherley
 Woodcote Primary School, Ashby-de-la-Zouch
 Woodhouse Eaves St Paul's CE Primary School, Woodhouse Eaves
 Woodland Grange Primary School, Oadby
 Woodstone Community Primary School, Ravenstone
 Woolden Hill Primary School, Anstey
 Worthington School, Worthington
 Wymeswold CE Primary School, Wymeswold

Secondary schools

 Ashby School, Ashby-de-la-Zouch
 Beauchamp College, Oadby
 Bosworth Academy, Desford
 Brockington College, Enderby
 Brookvale Groby Learning Campus, Groby
 Castle Donington College, Castle Donington
 The Castle Rock School, Coalville
 The Cedars Academy, Birstall
 Charnwood College, Loughborough
 Countesthorpe Academy, Countesthorpe
 De Lisle College, Loughborough
 Gartree High School, Oadby
 Hastings High School, Burbage
 Heath Lane Academy, Earl Shilton
 Hinckley Academy, Hinckley
 Humphrey Perkins School, Barrow upon Soar
 Ibstock Community College, Ibstock
 Ivanhoe School, Ashby-de-la-Zouch
 Iveshead School, Shepshed
 John Ferneley College, Melton Mowbray
 The Kibworth School, Kibworth
 Limehurst Academy, Loughborough
 Long Field Academy, Melton Mowbray
 Lutterworth College, Lutterworth
 Lutterworth High School, Lutterworth
 Manor High School, Oadby
 The Market Bosworth School, Market Bosworth
 The Martin High School, Anstey
 The Newbridge School, Coalville
 The Priory Belvoir Academy, Bottesford
 Rawlins Academy, Quorn
 Redmoor Academy, Hinckley
 Robert Smyth Academy, Market Harborough
 The Roundhill Academy, Thurmaston
 St Martin's Catholic Academy, Stoke Golding
 South Charnwood High School, Markfield
 South Wigston High School, South Wigston
 Stephenson Studio School, Coalville
 Thomas Estley Community College, Broughton Astley
 Welland Park Academy, Market Harborough
 Wigston Academy, Wigston
 The Winstanley School, Braunstone Town
 Woodbrook Vale School, Loughborough
 Wreake Valley Academy, Syston

Special and alternative schools 

 Ashmount School, Loughborough
 Birch Wood School, Melton Mowbray
 Compass Community School, Barwell
 Dorothy Goodman School, Hinckley
 Forest Way School, Coalville
 Foxfields Academy, Blaby
 The Fusion Academy, Barwell
 Maplewell Hall School, Woodhouse Eaves
 Oakfield School, Shepshed
 Wigston Birkett House Community Special School, Wigston Magna

Further education 
 Brooksby Melton College
 Loughborough College
 South Leicestershire College
 Stephenson College
 Wigston College

Independent schools

Primary and preparatory schools 
 Fairfield Preparatory School, Loughborough
 Twycross House Pre-Preparatory School, Twycross

Senior and all-through schools 

 Brooke House College, Market Harborough
 Brooke House Day School, Cosby
 Dixie Grammar School, Market Bosworth
 Leicester Grammar School, Great Glen
 Loughborough Amherst School, Loughborough
 Loughborough Grammar School, Loughborough
 Loughborough High School, Loughborough
 Ratcliffe College, Ratcliffe on the Wreake
 Stoneygate School, Great Glen
 Twycross House School, Twycross

Special and alternative schools 

 ALP Leicester, Birstall
 ASPIRE: Lifeskills, Loughborough
 The Cedars School, Hinckley
 Clovelly House School, Thornton
 Compass Community School Mountfields House, Loughborough
 Dovetree School, Hinckley
 The Grange Therapeutic School, Knossington
 Hardwick House School, Loughborough
 The Lady Byron School, Fleckney
 Lewis Charlton Learning Centre, Ashby-de-la-Zouch
 Lodge Farm Education, Broughton Astley
 Meadow View Farm School, Barwell
 Nanpantan Hall Nurture Centre, Loughborough
 Oakwood School, Barlestone
 The Place Independent School, Bottesford
 Quorn Hall School, Quorn
 REAL Independent Schools, Hinckley
 RNIB College, Loughborough
 Sketchley School, Burbage
 Wolfdale School, Anstey
 Woodfield School, Frolesworth
 Woodside Lodge Outdoor Learning Centre, Quorn

Further education 
 Welbeck Defence Sixth Form College, Woodhouse

Leicestershire
Schools in Leicestershire
Lists of buildings and structures in Leicestershire